Anna Mae Winburn (née Darden; August 13, 1913 – September 30, 1999) was an influential American vocalist and jazz bandleader who flourished beginning in the mid-1930s. An African American, she is best known for having directed the International Sweethearts of Rhythm, an all-female big band that was perhaps one of the few – and one of the most – racially integrated dance-bands of the swing era.

Career

Indiana and Nebraska
Her first known publicized performance was singing with the studio band of Radio WOWO, Fort Wayne. She worked at various clubs in Indiana, including the Chateau Lido in Indianapolis (where she appeared under the pseudonym Anita Door).

From there she moved to North Omaha, Nebraska, where she sang and played guitar for a variety of territory bands, or groups whose touring activities and popularity were geographically limited to several adjoining states, that were led by Red Perkins. During that time Winburn was a collaborator of Lloyd Hunter, frequently singing for Hunter's "Serenaders". She also led the Cotton Club Boys out of Omaha, a group that at one point included the amazing guitarist Charlie Christian. When many of the musicians were lost to the World War II draft, Winburn joined the International Sweethearts of Rhythm. Soon she went to Oklahoma City and led bands for a short while. It was there that she led Eddie Durham's "All-Girl Orchestra", which eventually earned her an invite to join the International Sweethearts of Rhythm.

International Sweethearts of Rhythm

Eddie Durham had been the composer for the International Sweethearts of Rhythm for two years before leaving to join Count Basie's band. After being recommended by Jimmie Jewel, who owned North Omaha's Dreamland Ballroom, Winburn became the leader of the band in 1941. She was reportedly hired for her attractive figure, with the intention of doing little actual composing or singing.

In the 1986 documentary film International Sweethearts of Rhythm, Winburn reported of her first meeting, "I said 'What a bunch of cute little girls, but I don't know whether I could get along with that many women or not.' " Despite rumors of Betty Carter being groomed to take her place after her marriage, Winburn was the leader of the band until it folded in late 1949.

Winburn formed other incarnations of the International Sweethearts for the next 10 years, often billing her name before the band's. However, those bands never regained the notoriety of the early years.  Anna Mae Winburn and Her Sweethearts  performed at the eighth Cavalcade of Jazz concert held also at Wrigley Field which was produced by Leon Hefflin Sr. in Los Angeles on June 1, 1952. Other featured artists were Jerry Wallace, Toni Harper, Roy Brown and His Mighty Men, Louis Jordan, Jimmy Witherspoon, and Josephine Baker.

Family 
Anna Mae Winburn was born in Port Royal, Tennessee, to Andrew Jackson Darden (1881–1956) and Lula Carnell (maiden; 1882–1929), a musical family. Her family moved to Kokomo, Indiana, when she was young.

She was the fourth oldest of 9 siblings – five brothers and three sisters:

 Lloyd W. Darden (1904–1977)
 Gus Darden (1905–1995)
 Matilda "Mattie" Ruth Darden (1909–1993)
 Carnell Andrew Darden (1914–1996)
 Easter Marie Darden (1917–1989)
 James Edwin Darden (1918–1979)
 Julia "Judy" Mae Darden (1920–1975)
 Morris Briggs Darden (1923–1955)

Marriages 
On January 2, 1930, Anna Mae Darden married Charles Raymond Winburn (1910–1960) in Howard County, Indiana. In 1947, Anna Mae Winburn was granted a divorce by the Howard County Circuit Court in Kokomo. In the divorce proceedings, she testified that Charles abandoned her in June 1934.

Around 1948, Winburn married "Duke" Pilgrim (né Eustace Michael Pilgrim; 1921–1970) around 1948. They had four children. They lived in Elmhurst, New York, among many Harlem transplants and jazz greats. Duke Pilgrim, before marrying Anna Mae, had been divorced from Albertha Adams (maiden; 1910–2005), a dancer whom he married April 27, 1940, in Manhattan.

Sisters 
Mattie, Judy, and Easter were also performers.

Mattie married William Hughes.

Judy sang with groups around Minneapolis.  She was married to Frank Shelton Perkins Jr. (1915–1985), a pianist and son of Red Perkins. Sometime around 1961 Judy married saxophonist and bandleader Percy Caesar Hughes (1922–2015) of Minneapolis. Judy, then known as Julia Mae Hughes, died of lung cancer on January 1, 1975.

Easter married drummer and vibist "Jeep" Stewart (born William Alfred Stewart around 1920), and after divorcing him, later married James Elias Overton (1922–1986). Easter has been twice married before, first, in 1936, to Samuel L. Thurman, and second, in 1943, to Ulysses Grant Waldon, Jr. (1912–1978).

Death 
Winburn died on September 30, 1999, in Hempstead, New York.

Notes and references

Notes

References

External links
Photographs
 Anna Mae Winburn with Maurice King
 Anna Mae Winburn at piano
 Anna Mae Winburn
 International Sweethearts of Rhythm Collection Spotlight, Because of Her Story, Smithsonian Institution

1913 births
1999 deaths
American jazz bandleaders
American jazz singers
Big band bandleaders
American women jazz singers
Musicians from Omaha, Nebraska
People from Omaha, Nebraska
People from Montgomery County, Tennessee
20th-century American singers
20th-century American women singers
People from Robertson County, Tennessee
Jazz musicians from Tennessee
Jazz musicians from Nebraska
People from Elmhurst, Queens
International Sweethearts of Rhythm members
Jazz musicians from New York (state)